David John Moore Cornwell (19 October 193112 December 2020), better known by his pen name John le Carré, was a British and Irish author, best known for his espionage novels, many of which were successfully adapted for film or television. "A sophisticated, morally ambiguous writer", he is considered one of the greatest novelists of the postwar era. During the 1950s and 1960s he worked for both the Security Service (MI5) and the Secret Intelligence Service (MI6). 

Le Carré's third novel, The Spy Who Came in from the Cold (1963), became an international best-seller, was adapted as an award-winning film and remains one of his best-known works. This success allowed him to leave MI6 to become a full-time author. His novels which have been adapted for film or television include The Looking Glass War (1965), Tinker Tailor Soldier Spy (1974), Smiley's People (1979), The Little Drummer Girl (1983), The Night Manager (1993), The Tailor of Panama (1996), The Constant Gardener (2001), A Most Wanted Man (2008), and Our Kind of Traitor (2010). Philip Roth said that A Perfect Spy (1986) was "the best English novel since the war".

Early life

Childhood
David John Moore Cornwell was born on 19 October 1931 in Poole, Dorset, England. His father was Ronald Thomas Archibald (Ronnie) Cornwell (1905–75), and his mother was Olive Moore Cornwell (née Glassey, b. 1906–1989). His older brother, Tony (1929–2017), was an advertising executive and county cricketer (for Dorset), who later lived in the United States. His younger half-sister was the actress Charlotte Cornwell (1949–2021), and his younger half-brother, Rupert Cornwell (1946-2017), was a former Washington bureau chief for The Independent. Cornwell had little early memory of his mother, who had left their family home when he was five years old. His maternal uncle was Liberal MP Alec Glassey. When Cornwell was 21 years old, Glassey gave him the address in Ipswich where his mother was living. Some sixteen years later, mother and son reacquainted at Ipswich railway platform, at her written invitation, following Cornwell's initial letter of reconciliation.

Cornwell's father had been jailed for insurance fraud and was a known associate of the Kray twins. The family was continually in debt. The father–son relationship has been described as "difficult". The Guardian reported that Le Carré recalled that he had been "beaten up by his father and grew up mostly starved of affection after his mother abandoned him at the age of five". Rick Pym, a scheming con man and the father of A Perfect Spy protagonist Magnus Pym, was based on Ronnie. When his father died in 1975, Cornwell paid for a memorial funeral service but did not attend, a plot point repeated in A Perfect Spy.

Education
Cornwell's schooling began at St Andrew's Preparatory School, near Pangbourne, Berkshire, and continued at Sherborne School. He grew unhappy with the typically harsh English public school regime of the time and disliked his disciplinarian housemaster. He left Sherborne early to study foreign languages at the University of Bern from 1948 to 1949. In 1950, he was called up for National Service and served in the Intelligence Corps of the British Army garrisoned in Allied-occupied Austria, working as a German language interrogator of people who had crossed the Iron Curtain to the West. In 1952, he returned to England to study at Lincoln College, Oxford, where he worked covertly for the British Security Service, MI5, spying on far-left groups for information about possible Soviet agents. During his studies, he was a member of a college dining society known as The Goblin Club.

When his father was declared bankrupt in 1954, Cornwell left Oxford to teach at Millfield Preparatory School; however, a year later he returned to Oxford, and graduated in 1956 with a first class degree in modern languages. He then taught French and German at Eton College for two years, becoming an MI5 officer in 1958.

Work in security services
He ran agents, conducted interrogations, tapped telephone lines, and effected break-ins. Encouraged by Lord Clanmorris (who wrote crime novels as "John Bingham"), and while being an active MI5 officer, Cornwell began writing his first novel, Call for the Dead (1961). Cornwell identified Lord Clanmorris as one of two models for George Smiley, the spymaster of the Circus, the other being Vivian H. H. Green. As a schoolboy, Cornwell first met the latter when Green was the Chaplain and Assistant Master at Sherborne School (1942–51). The friendship continued after Green's move to Lincoln College, where he tutored Cornwell.

In 1960, Cornwell transferred to MI6, the foreign-intelligence service, and worked under the cover of Second Secretary at the British Embassy in Bonn. He was later transferred to Hamburg as a political consul. There, he wrote the detective story A Murder of Quality (1962) and The Spy Who Came in from the Cold (1963), as "John le Carré" (le Carré is French for "the square")—a pseudonym required because Foreign Office staff were forbidden to publish in their own names.

In 1964, le Carré's career as an intelligence officer came to an end as the result of the betrayal of British agents' covers to the KGB by Kim Philby, the infamous British double agent, one of the Cambridge Five. Le Carré depicted and analysed Philby as the upper-class traitor, codenamed "Gerald" by the KGB, the mole hunted by George Smiley in Tinker Tailor Soldier Spy (1974).

Writing
Le Carré's first two novels, Call for the Dead (1961) and A Murder of Quality (1962), are mystery fiction. Each features a retired spy, George Smiley, investigating a death; in the first book, the apparent suicide of a suspected communist, and in the second volume, a murder at a boys' public school. Although Call for the Dead evolves into an espionage story, Smiley's motives are more personal than political. Le Carré's third novel, The Spy Who Came in from the Cold (1963), became an international best-seller and remains one of his best-known works; following its publication, he left MI6 to become a full-time writer. Although le Carré had intended The Spy Who Came in from the Cold as an indictment of espionage as morally compromised, audiences widely viewed its protagonist, Alec Leamas, as a tragic hero. In response, le Carré's next book, The Looking Glass War, was a satire about an increasingly deadly espionage mission which ultimately proves pointless.

Tinker Tailor Soldier Spy, The Honourable Schoolboy, and Smiley's People (the Karla trilogy) brought Smiley back as the central figure in a sprawling espionage saga depicting his efforts first to root out a mole in the Circus and then to entrap his Soviet rival and counterpart, code-named 'Karla'. The trilogy was originally meant to be a long-running series that would find Smiley dispatching agents after Karla all around the world. Smiley's People marked the last time Smiley featured as the central character in a le Carré story, although he brought the character back in The Secret Pilgrim and A Legacy of Spies.

A Perfect Spy (1986), which chronicles the boyhood moral education of Magnus Pym and how it leads to his becoming a spy, is the author's most autobiographical espionage novel, reflecting the boy's very close relationship with his con man father. Biographer LynnDianne Beene describes the novelist's own father, Ronnie Cornwell, as "an epic con man of little education, immense charm, extravagant tastes, but no social values". Le Carré reflected that "writing A Perfect Spy is probably what a very wise shrink would have advised". He also wrote a semi-autobiographical work, The Naïve and Sentimental Lover (1971), as the story of a man's midlife existential crisis.

With the fall of the Iron Curtain in 1989, le Carré's writing shifted to portrayal of the new multilateral world. His first completely post-Cold War novel, The Night Manager (1993), deals with drug and arms smuggling in the murky world of Latin American drug lords, shady Caribbean banking entities, and western officials who look the other way.

His final novel, Silverview, was published posthumously in 2021.

Themes
Most of le Carré's books are spy stories set during the Cold War (1945–91) and portray British Intelligence agents as unheroic political functionaries, aware of the moral ambiguity of their work and engaged more in psychological than physical drama. While "[espionage] was the genre that earned him fame...he used it as a platform to explore larger ethical problems and the human condition". The insight he demonstrated led "many fellow authors and critics [to regard] him as one of the finest English-language novelists of the twentieth century." His writing explores "human frailty—moral ambiguity, intrigue, nuance, doubt, and cowardice".

The fallibility of Western democracy - and of its secret services - is a recurring theme, as are suggestions of a possible east–west moral equivalence. Characters experience little of the violence typically encountered in action thrillers and have very little recourse to gadgets. Much of the conflict is internal, rather than external and visible. The recurring character George Smiley, who plays a central role in five novels and appears as a supporting character in four more, was written as an "antidote" to James Bond, a character le Carré called "an international gangster" rather than a spy and who he felt should be excluded from the canon of espionage literature. In contrast, he intended Smiley, who is an overweight, bespectacled bureaucrat who uses cunning and manipulation to achieve his ends, as an accurate depiction of a spy.

Le Carré's "writing entered intelligence services themselves. He popularized the term 'mole'...and other language that has become intelligence vernacular on both sides of the Atlantic — 'honeytrap', 'scalphunter', 'lamplighter' to name a few." However, in his first tweet as MI6's chief, Richard Moore revealed the agency's "complicated relationship with the author: He urged would-be Smileys not to apply to the service."

Other writing, film cameo
Le Carré records a number of incidents from his period as a diplomat in his autobiographical work, The Pigeon Tunnel: Stories from My Life (2016), which include escorting six visiting German parliamentarians to a London brothel and translating at a meeting between a senior German politician and Harold Macmillan.

As a journalist, le Carré wrote The Unbearable Peace (1991), a nonfiction account of Brigadier Jean-Louis Jeanmaire (1911–1992), the Swiss Army officer who spied for the Soviet Union from 1962 until 1975.

Credited under his pen name, le Carré appears as an extra in the 2011 film version of Tinker Tailor Soldier Spy, among the guests at the Christmas party in several flashback scenes.

Politics

Threats to democracy
In 2017, le Carré expressed concerns over the future of liberal democracy, saying "I think of all things that were happening across Europe in the 1930s, in Spain, in Japan, obviously in Germany. To me, these are absolutely comparable signs of the rise of fascism and it's contagious, it's infectious. Fascism is up and running in Poland and Hungary. There's an encouragement about". He later wrote that the end of the Cold War had left the West without a coherent ideology, in contrast to the "notion of individual freedom, of inclusiveness, of tolerance – all of that we called anti-communism" prevailing during that time.

Le Carré opposed both U.S. President Donald Trump and Russian President Vladimir Putin, arguing that their desire to seek or maintain their countries' superpower status caused an impulse "for oligarchy, the dismissal of the truth, the contempt, actually, for the electorate and for the democratic system". Le Carré compared Trump's tendency to dismiss the media as "fake news" to the Nazi book burnings, and wrote that the United States is "heading straight down the road to institutional racism and neo-fascism".

In Le Carré's 2019 novel Agent Running in the Field, one of the novel's characters refers to Trump as "Putin's shithouse cleaner" who "does everything for little Vladi that little Vladi can't do for himself". The novel's narrator describes Boris Johnson as "a pig-ignorant foreign secretary". He says Russia is moving "backwards into her dark, delusional past", with Britain following a short way behind. Le Carré later said that he believed the novel's plotline, involving the U.S. and British intelligence services colluding to subvert the European Union, to be "horribly possible".

Brexit
Le Carré was an outspoken advocate of European integration and sharply criticised Brexit. Le Carré criticised Brexit advocates such as Boris Johnson (whom he referred to as a "mob orator"), Dominic Cummings, and Nigel Farage in interviews, claiming that their "task is to fire up the people with nostalgia [and] with anger". He further opined in interviews that "What really scares me about nostalgia is that it's become a political weapon. Politicians are creating a nostalgia for an England that never existed, and selling it, really, as something we could return to", adding that with "the demise of the working class we saw also the demise of an established social order, based on the stability of ancient class structures". On the other hand, he said that in the Labour Party "they have this Leninist element and they have this huge appetite to level society."

On Brexit, le Carré did not mince his words, comparing it to the 1956 Suez crisis which confirmed post-imperial Britain's loss of global power. "This is without doubt the greatest catastrophe and the greatest idiocy that Britain has perpetrated since the invasion of Suez", le Carré said of Brexit. "Nobody is to blame but the Brits themselves – not the Irish, not the Europeans." "The idea, to me, that at the moment we should imagine we can substitute access to the biggest trade union in the world with access to the American market is terrifying", he said.

Speaking to The Guardian in 2019, he commented "I've always believed, though ironically it's not the way I've voted, that it's compassionate conservatism that in the end could, for example, integrate the private schooling system. If you do it from the left you will seem to be acting out of resentment; do it from the right and it looks like good social organisation." Le Carré also said that "I think my own ties to England were hugely loosened over the last few years. And it's a kind of liberation, if a sad kind."

US invasion of Iraq
In January 2003, two months prior to the invasion, The Times published le Carré's essay "The United States Has Gone Mad" criticising the buildup to the Iraq War and President George W. Bush's response to the 11 September 2001 terrorist attacks, calling it "worse than McCarthyism, worse than the Bay of Pigs and in the long term potentially more disastrous than the Vietnam War" and "beyond anything Osama bin Laden could have hoped for in his nastiest dreams". Le Carré participated in the London protests against the Iraq War. He said the war resulted from the "politicisation of intelligence to fit the political intentions" of governments and "How Bush and his junta succeeded in deflecting America's anger from bin Laden to Saddam Hussein is one of the great public relations conjuring tricks of history".

He was critical of Tony Blair's role in taking Britain into the Iraq War, saying "I can't understand that Blair has an afterlife at all. It seems to me that any politician who takes his country to war under false pretences has committed the ultimate sin. I think that a war in which we refuse to accept the body count of those that we kill is also a war of which we should be ashamed".

Iran
Le Carré was critical of Western governments' policies towards Iran. He said that Iran's actions are a response to being "encircled by nuclear powers" and by the way in which "we ousted Mosaddeq through the CIA and the Secret Service here across the way and installed the Shah and trained his ghastly secret police force in all the black arts, the SAVAK".

Le Carré feuded with Salman Rushdie over The Satanic Verses, stating that "nobody has a God-given right to insult a great religion and be published with impunity".

Israel
In a 1998 interview with Douglas Davis, Le Carré described Israel as "the most extraordinary carnival of human variety that I have ever set eyes on, a nation in the process of re-assembling itself from the shards of its past, now Oriental, now Western, now secular, now religious, but always anxiously moralizing about itself, criticizing itself with Maoist ferocity, a nation crackling with debate, rediscovering its past while it fought for its future." He declared: "No nation on earth was more deserving of peace—or more condemned to fight for it."

Personal life
In 1954, Cornwell married Alison Ann Veronica Sharp. They had three sons: Simon, Stephen, and Timothy—and divorced in 1971. In 1972, Cornwell married Valérie Jane Eustace, a book editor with Hodder & Stoughton who collaborated with him behind the scenes. They had a son, Nicholas, who writes as Nick Harkaway. Le Carré lived in St Buryan, Cornwall, for more than 40 years; he owned a mile of cliff near Land's End. Le Carré also owned a house in Gainsborough Gardens in Hampstead in north London.

Le Carré was so disillusioned by the 2016 Brexit vote to leave the European Union that he secured Irish citizenship. In a BBC documentary broadcast in 2021, le Carré's son Nicholas revealed that his father's disillusionment with modern Britain, and Brexit in particular, had driven him to embrace his Irish heritage and become an Irish citizen. At the time of his death, le Carré's friend, the novelist John Banville, confirmed that the writer had researched his family roots in Inchinattin, near Rosscarbery, County Cork, and that he had applied for an Irish passport, to which he was entitled having completed the process of becoming an Irish citizen and having Irish ancestry through his maternal grandmother, Olive Wolfe. His neighbour and friend Philippe Sands recalled: 

Le Carré died at Royal Cornwall Hospital, Truro, on 12 December 2020, aged 89. An inquest completed in June 2021 concluded that le Carré died after sustaining a fall at his home. His wife Valérie died on 27 February 2021, two months after her husband, at age 82.

Le Carré's son Timothy died on 31 May 2022 at the age of 59, shortly after he finished editing A Private Spy, a collection of his father's letters.

Selected bibliography

Novels
 Call for the Dead (1961), 
 A Murder of Quality (1962), 
 The Spy Who Came in from the Cold (1963), 
 The Looking Glass War (1965), 
 A Small Town in Germany (1968), 
 The Naïve and Sentimental Lover (1971), 
 Smiley Versus Karla trilogy
 Tinker Tailor Soldier Spy (1974), 
 The Honourable Schoolboy (1977), 
 Smiley's People (1979), 
 The Little Drummer Girl (1983), 
 A Perfect Spy (1986), 
 The Russia House (1989), 
 The Secret Pilgrim (1990), 
 The Night Manager (1993), 
 Our Game (1995), 
 The Tailor of Panama (1996), 
 Single & Single (1999), 
 The Constant Gardener (2001), 
 Absolute Friends (2003), 
 The Mission Song (2006), 
 A Most Wanted Man (2008), 
 Our Kind of Traitor (2010), 
 A Delicate Truth (2013), 
 A Legacy of Spies (2017), 
 Agent Running in the Field (2019), 
 Silverview (2021),

Archive
In 2010, le Carré donated his literary archive to the Bodleian Library, Oxford. The initial 85 boxes of material deposited included handwritten drafts of Tinker Tailor Soldier Spy and The Constant Gardener. The library hosted a public display of these and other items to mark World Book Day in March 2011.

Awards and honours
 1963, British Crime Writers' Association Gold Dagger for The Spy Who Came in from the Cold
 1964, Somerset Maugham Award for The Spy Who Came in from the Cold
 1965, Mystery Writers of America Edgar Award for The Spy Who Came in from the Cold
 1977, British Crime Writers' Association Gold Dagger for The Honourable Schoolboy
 1977, James Tait Black Memorial Prize Fiction Award for The Honourable Schoolboy
 1983, Japan Adventure Fiction Association Prize for The Little Drummer Girl
 1984, Honorary Fellow Lincoln College, Oxford
 1984, Mystery Writers of America Edgar Grand Master
 1988, Crime Writers' Association Diamond Dagger Lifetime Achievement Award
 1988, The Malaparte Prize, Italy
 1990, Honorary degree, University of Exeter
 1990, Helmerich Award of the Tulsa Library Trust.

 1996, Honorary degree, University of St. Andrews
 1997, Honorary degree, University of Southampton
 1998, Honorary degree, University of Bath
 2005, Crime Writers' Association Dagger of Daggers for The Spy Who Came in from the Cold
 2005, Commander of the Order of Arts and Letters, France
 2008, honorary doctorate, University of Bern
 2011, Goethe Medal, awarded by the Goethe Institute
 2012, Honorary degree of Doctor of Letters, University of Oxford
 2020, Olof Palme Prize – le Carré donated the US$100,000 prize money to Médecins Sans Frontières.

In addition in 2008, The Times ranked le Carré 22nd on its list of the "50 greatest British writers since 1945".

Citations

Sources

Further reading

External links

 
 Two interviews at NPR's Fresh Air
 
 Two letters at Leeds University Library
 

 
1931 births
2020 deaths
20th-century English male writers
20th-century English novelists
20th-century Irish male writers
20th-century Irish novelists
20th-century pseudonymous writers
21st-century English male writers
21st-century English novelists
21st-century Irish male writers
21st-century Irish novelists
21st-century pseudonymous writers
Accidental deaths from falls
Accidental deaths in England
Alumni of Lincoln College, Oxford
Cartier Diamond Dagger winners
Commandeurs of the Ordre des Arts et des Lettres
Edgar Award winners
English spy fiction writers
English thriller writers
Intelligence Corps officers
Irish thriller writers
James Tait Black Memorial Prize recipients
MI5 personnel
People educated at Sherborne School
People educated at St Andrew's School, Pangbourne
People from Poole
Schoolteachers from Dorset
Secret Intelligence Service personnel
Writers from Dorset
Teachers at Eton College